Navy Island Royal Naval Shipyard was a Royal Navy yard in Ontario.

Located on Navy Island in the Niagara River, it served as a French naval base in the early 18th century and was acquired by the British in 1763. The Royal Navy used it for their Lake Erie fleet during the War of 1812. Abandoned by the navy with the passage of the Rush-Bagot Treaty in 1817, it was formally acquired by Canada in 1822. It is now a National Historic site and managed by the Niagara Parks Commission.

Ships built (two sloops and three schooners), repaired or defending or stationed at the base included:

  (1) - schooner 1814, sunk 1828; raised and displayed since 1953
 
 HMS Hunter
  (1) 
 
 
 HMS Little Belt 
 Huron - schooner 1761
 Michigan - sloop 1762
 Royal Charlotte - sloop 1764
 Boston - schooner 1764
  - schooner 1764
 Gladwyn - schooner 1764
 Newash - schooner 1815 (1)
 Minos - steam vessel 1840 (1)

(1) - built in Chippawa

See also
 Battle of Lake Erie
 Provincial Marine

References
 HMS Tecumseth
 Canadian Historical Naval Ships and Yards
 Ships from the age of sail
 Niagara Parks - Navy Island
 Battle of Lake Erie
 List of Vessels Employed on British Naval Service on the Great Lakes, 1755-1875

Naval history of Canada
Royal Navy bases in Canada
Royal Navy dockyards in Canada
1763 establishments in the British Empire